Paul Sawyier (March 23, 1865 – November 5, 1917), one of Kentucky's most renowned artists, was an American impressionist painter.

Early life and education
Sawyier, the son of Dr. Nathaniel and Ellen Wingate Sawyier, was born on March 23, 1865, on his grandfather's farm near London in Madison County, Ohio. In 1870, he moved with his family to Frankfort, Kentucky.

After high school Sawyier attended the McMicken School of Design (now the Art Academy of Cincinnati), studying under Frank Duveneck and Thomas Satterwhite Noble.  In 1889, he furthered his art studies under William Merritt Chase at the Art Students League of New York.

Career as artist
Sawyier worked mostly in watercolor and is best known for his scenes in the Frankfort, Kentucky area and New York.  
Sawyier is noted for his paintings of the Kentucky and Dix rivers. In 1893, Sawyier went to the Chicago's World's Columbian Exposition, where some of his works were in the State of Kentucky display.

Sawyier originals are on display in Frankfort, Kentucky at Liberty Hall & Orlando Brown House, Paul Sawyier Art Gallery, Kentucky History Center, Kings Daughter's Apartments, and at the University of Kentucky Art Museum in Lexington and Speed Art Museum in Louisville, Kentucky.

Later life and death

From 1913 until his death, Sawyier lived in a converted chapel at "Highpoint," the estate of art patron Mrs. Marshall L. Emory in the New York Catskills. On November 5, 1917, at the age of 52, Sawyier died of a heart attack. He was buried in a cemetery in Fleischmanns, New York. Five years later, his cousin, Judge Russel McReary, returned Sawyier's body to be reinterred on June 9, 1923, in the Sawyier-Wingate family plot in Frankfort Cemetery in Kentucky. At the time of his death it is estimated that he painted 3,000 works, mostly watercolor landscapes.

References

External links

 Paul Sawyier Gallery
 
 Library named for the artist in Frankfort, KY
  Paul Sawyier paintings at the Kentucky Historical Society

1865 births
1917 deaths
Burials at Frankfort Cemetery
People from Frankfort, Kentucky
19th-century American painters
American male painters
20th-century American painters
Painters from Kentucky
Art Academy of Cincinnati alumni
American Impressionist painters
People from Madison County, Ohio
Painters from Ohio
Art Students League of New York alumni
19th-century American male artists
20th-century American male artists